Thomas May (c. 1645 – 1718), of Rawmere, Lavant, Sussex, was an English politician.

He was a Member (MP) of the Parliament of England for Chichester in 1689, 1690 and 1691.

References

1645 births
1718 deaths
People from Chichester
English MPs 1689–1690
English MPs 1690–1695
People from Lavant, West Sussex